Crambus cyrnellus is a species of moth in the family Crambidae. It was described by Karl Schawerda in 1926 and is found on Corsica.

References

Moths described in 1926
Crambini
Moths of Europe